Anil Ananthaswamy is an Indian author, and science journalist, who is currently a Knight Science Journalism Research fellow at the Massachusetts Institute of Technology. He has been a deputy news editor and staff writer for the London-based New Scientist science magazine. 

He is also a contributor to the science writing program at the University of California, Santa Cruz, and is affiliated to the National Centre for Biological Sciences, Bangalore. He is a guest contributor on Science and Physics for New Scientist, Quanta, Scientific American, PNS Front Matter, Nature, Nautilus, Matter, The Wall Street Journal, Discover, and the UK's Literary Review.

Works
Ananthaswamy explores themes around cosmology, the universe, theoretical physics, and quantum physics in his works. Books authored by him include: 
 The Edge of Physics: A Journey to Earth's Extremes to Unlock the Secrets of the Universe (2010)
 The Man Who Wasn't There: Tales from the Edge of the Self (2015)
 Through Two Doors at Once: The Elegant Experiment that Captures the Enigma of Our Quantum Reality (2018)

Awards and recognition
Ananthaswamy won the inaugural Physics Journalism Prize from the UK Institute of Physics (IOP) in 2010. He received this award for his feature in the March issue of the New Scientist, Hip Hip Array,  which details the plans to build the Square Kilometre Array, an ambitious radio telescope with receiver dishes covering a square kilometer in area. 

Ananthaswamy's first book, The Edge of Physics, was voted as the book of the year in 2010 by UK's Physics World. His second book, The Man Who Wasn't There, was long listed for the 2016 PEN/E. O. Wilson Literary Science Writing Award. His most recent book, Through Two Doors at Once, was named one of Smithsonian's favorite books of 2018, and one of Forbes' best books about Astronomy, Physics, and Mathematics in 2018.

References

External links 

 
 

Year of birth missing (living people)
Living people
Indian science journalists
Indian male journalists
Science journalists